Marshall Islands competed at the 2019 Pacific Games in Apia, Samoa from 7 to 20 July 2019. The country participated in four sports at the 2019 games.

Athletics

One athlete was selected to compete for Marshall Islands in athletics at the 2019 games.

Men
 Sione Aho: Discus, Shot put

Basketball

Marshall Islands selected eight players to compete in 3x3 basketball at the 2019 games.

Men
 Lani Ackley
 Robert Case
 Frederick Kurn
 Halber Pinho

Women
 Naupaka Ackley
 Tamara Andrike
 Joy Ratidara
 Neikormo Lanki-Nimoto

Volleyball

Beach volleyball

Two female players  were selected to compete for the Marshall Islands in beach volleyball at the 2019 games.

Women
 Sidra Triplett – (Quarter-finalist)
 Aliyah Brown – (Quarter-finalist)

Weightlifting

Three athletes were selected to compete for the Marshall Islands in weightlifting at the 2019 games.

Men
 Mike Riklon
 Kabuati Bob
 Joshua Ralpho

References

Nations at the 2019 Pacific Games
2019